This list comprises all players who have participated in at least one league match for Spokane Spiders since the team's first season in the USL Premier Development League in 2007. Players who were on the roster but never played a first team game are not listed; players who appeared for the team in other competitions (US Open Cup, etc.) but never actually made an USL appearance are noted at the bottom of the page where appropriate.

A
  Dustin Allberry
  Daniel Anderson

B
  Seth Baker
  Conor Baranski
  Nick Barclay
  Scott Barnum
  John Brookover
  Galen Brooks

C
  Patrick Carbery
  Adam Crossingham
  Alexander Crossingham

D
  Scott Davidson
  Dain Dezellem
  Rawley Doggett
  Jesse Dunbar

E
  Logan Emory

F
  Grant Falco
  Tyler Falco
  Abbas Faridnia
  Matt Friesen
  Ben Funkhouser
  Nick Funkhouser

G
  Justin Grider

H
  Skye Henderson

J
  Konner Jackson
  Jeremy Jacobs
  Jonathan Janssen
  Travis Jette
  Eric Johnson

K
  Keith Kirsch
  Jake Kruegar
  Eric Kurimura

L
  Justin Linafelter
  Nick Love
  Grant Lundberg

M
  Andrew Mastronardi
  Brian McMurdie
  Chase Mikkelsen
  Halvor Mikkelson
  Matt Miller
  Jake Moug
  Hawk Mummey
  Tim Muravez

P
  Joshua Peck
  Tye Perdido
  Pete Peterson
  Dan Philp
  Dustin Pilcher
  David Powers
  Ryan Powers
  Edward Prugh
  John Prugh

R
  Admir Rasic
  Keith Realing
  Jesse Retan
  Ben Rotert

S
  Dan Scott
  Christian Seon
  Dade Smith
  Zach Smith
  Jeffrey Srock
  Matt Stueckle

T
  Chad Thompson

V
  Blaze Vela
  Jay Vela

W
  Jeffrey Wallace
  Austin Washington
  Avery Washington
  Mitchell Weller

Y
  Zachary Yeager

Sources

Spokane Spiders
 
Association football player non-biographical articles